Caught in the Trees is a 2008 album released by Indie rock musician Damien Jurado. It is his eighth full-length album release.

Pitchfork Media gave the album a favorable review, calling it "a rock solid outing from backing bandmates Jenna Conrad and Eric Fisher supporting some of Jurado's best songwriting to date".  Paste Magazine also praised the album, writing that it "alternates between lean, biting folk-rock and haunting ballads that seem to float up from deep, dark wells. With his pair of bandmate friends by his side, he sounds less alone than ever before, and Conrad's pliant harmonies are a great boon."

Track listing

References

External links 
 Album page on Secretly Canadian

2008 albums
Secretly Canadian albums
Damien Jurado albums